Fast Eddys Cafe was a fast food and restaurant chain that primarily operated in Perth, Western Australia and also briefly in Adelaide, South Australia, Cairns, Queensland, Melbourne, Victoria, as well as in New South Wales. Fast Eddys was most notable at the time of its establishment for being one of the few Perth restaurants open 24 hours a day, 7 days a week including public holidays.

In May 2019, the final remaining Perth CBD location closed after 41 years in business.

Style

The restaurants were split up into two sections, a sit-down table service restaurant and a take away section. The take away section has similar food to the restaurant experience, however it is less expensive and tailored for the take-away market. The restaurants are decorated with various historic memorabilia such as old advertising signs and number plates.

The flagship burger was the EddyBurger. Other items included the Cop-the-Lot Burger, the Steakburger and the Super Hotdog. The restaurant also served all day breakfast items.

History

Fast Eddys was founded in 1979 at the west end of the Perth CBD, on the corner of Hay Street and Milligan Street by Christopher and Con Somas. The restaurant moved to a new location at 454 Murray Street in the early 1990s, were it remained until its closure in 2019. It was rumoured that Fast Eddys took its name from the Paul Newman fictional character (Fast) Eddie Felson from the 1961 US drama film The Hustler, although there are no sources to prove this. It was in fact, named after one of the original founding partners, Eddy Jonaitis who passed away in 1999. Source, “The West Australian”, Pearce, 1999z

By the mid 1990s, Christopher and Con Somas had sold the business. In the following years, the new owners Ernie and Mark Galloway opened new restaurants across Western Australia, and by 2001 the company expanded into New South Wales, South Australia and Victoria. However, in 2002 the company went into receivership, with most of the restaurants closing down in the eastern states, and the WA restaurants being sold off as franchises.

Apart from the original Perth CBD restaurant, other locations of Fast Eddys restaurants in Western Australia included Morley, Armadale, Cannington and Kalgoorlie.

See also

 List of restaurant chains in Australia

References

Further reading
 Poprzeczny, Joe.(2001) Food speeds down fast lane. (History of fast food industry in WA, from days of Bernies during WWII to Van Eileens in the 1960s to Fast Eddys and Chicken Treat). Business news - Perth, W.A., 15/3/2001, p. 4-5.

External links 
Frommers Review of Fast Eddy's Cafe Perth

Fast-food chains of Australia
Defunct fast-food chains
Fast-food franchises
Restaurants established in 1979
Restaurants in Perth, Western Australia
Restaurants disestablished in 2019
Australian companies disestablished in 2019
Defunct restaurants in Australia
Australian companies established in 1979